Periconia circinata is an ascomycete fungus that is a plant pathogen affecting maize and sorghum.

See also 
 List of maize diseases
 List of sorghum diseases

References

External links 
 Index Fungorum
 USDA ARS Fungal Database

Fungal plant pathogens and diseases
Maize diseases
Sorghum diseases
Pleosporales
Ascomycota enigmatic taxa
Fungi described in 1906